Pavle Medaković  (1953, Belgrade, Yugoslavia) is a Serbian conductor.

Education 
After obtaining degree at conducting at the Faculty of Music in Belgrade 1977, he completed his further studies in 1982. under prof. Karl Österreicher at the Hochschule für Music in Vienna (University of Music and Performing Arts). M.Mus. degree at the  Belgrade Faculty of Music Art in 1990. He later received advanced training at the master classes with Prof. Pierre Dervaux (1980) and Sergiu Celibidache (1981).

Career 
While he was studying he worked as a conductor of the famous Branko Krsmanovich chorus and won two first prizes at the Belgrade Chorus Festival in 1976. The same year he became the principal conductor of the Belgrade Chamber Opera and he performed operas by V.Fioravanti, D.Cimarosa, G. C. Menotti, G.Rossini, L.Chailly, G.Bizet, D.Radich, to mention just a few. With the same ensemble he conducted in Udine (Italy) at the Fourth International Festival of Modern Chamber Music (1980).
He performed concerts with the Belgrade Philharmonic, Serbian Radio-Television Symphony Orchestra, Macedonian Philharmonic, Nis Symphony Orchestra, Seville Symphony Orchestra (Spain), Polish National Radio Symphony Orchestra (Poland), Burgas Symphony Orchestra and Ruse Symphony Orchestra (Bulgaria), Dresden Philharmonic (Germany).
For two years he was the artistic director of Franco -Yugoslav Musical Week (1981 and 1982), as a conductor of the Symphony Orchestra. After his successful concert with the "Ignaz Paderewsky" Philharmonic Orchestra (Pomeranian Philharmonic) in Poland (1988) he became their permanent guest conductor for many seasons (till 2006). For two years (1996 and 1997) he worked as a conductor at the Summer Academy of Sacred Music in Studenica Monastery (Serbia).
Mr. Medakovich was the artistic director and the first conductor of the Symphony Orchestra in Mostar (Bosnia-Herzegovina) from 1983 to 1985. For two seasons, from 1986 to 1988, he was the conductor of chorus "Abrashevich" in Belgrade. From 1988 Mr. Medakovich is the principal conductor and artistic director of the Symphony Orchestra "Stanislav Binicki",Belgrade. The 2000 he was Director of Belgrade Philharmonic Orchestra. At the moment| he is principal conductor and artistic director of Symphony Orchestra "Stanislav Binicki", Belgrade. He is also a professor of orchestral training at the "Academy for Beauty Arts" in Belgrade.

During 30 years working as a conductor Mr. Medakovich has had more than 1200 concerts of symphonic and choral music. His repertoire comprises pieces of music from classic to contemporary composers. Having in mind the repertoire, Mr. Medakovich can take over conducting the orchestra in case the planned conductor cancels his participation in the last moment. Moreover, he has exceptional contact with young soloists who have first appearance with orchestra. He has successfully collaborated with the following artists: Vadim Brodski (violin, Italy), Nikolai Demidienko (piano, Russia), Pavlina Dokovska (piano, SAD), Maria Baranowska (violin, Poland), Georgios Demertzis, (violin, Greek), Neal Larrabee (piano, SAD), Massimo Giorgi (double bass, Italy), Micho Dimitrov, (violin, Bulgaria), Andrei Nikolsky, (piano, Russia), Boris Pamukdžijev (oboe, Bulgaria), Ivan Zenati (violin, Tscheh), Konstantin Bogino (piano, Paris), Igor Lazko (piano, Paris), Vladimir Krpan (piano, Croatia) Jovan Kolundžija (violin, Serbia), Ksenija Janković (cello, Germany), Sreten Krstic (violin, Germany), Natasa Veljkovic (piano, Austria), Stefan Milenković (violin, SAD), Jasminka Stancul (piano, Austria), Rita Kinka (piano, Serbia), Aleksandar Madžar (Belgium), Darko Veličkovski (SAD), Dejan Bravnitschar (violin, Slovenia), Radmila Bakočevich (soprano, Serbia), Radmila Smiljanic (soprano, Serbia), Ruža Pospiš Baldani (mezzo-soprano, Croatia),Vladimir Ruzdjak (baritone, Croatia), Gertruda Munitich (soprano, Bosnia-Herzegovina), Jadranka Jovanovic (mezzo-soprano, Serbia), Milena Kitic (mezzo-soprano, SAD), Irena Zaric (mezzo-soprano SAD), Boris Trajanov (baritone, Germany) Gordana Jevtovich (soprano, Serbia), Dunja Simich (soprano, Germany), Jovo Reljin (tenor, Swiss), Slobodan Stankovich (baritone, Swiss), Dubravka Zubovich (mezzo-soprano, SAD), Nikola Mitich (baritone, Serbia), Oliver Njego (baritone, Serbia), Ištvan Varga (cello, Serbia), Ivan Dinich (piano, Serbia), Aleksandar Sandorov (piano, Serbia), Dejan Sinadinovich (piano, Serbia), Dubravka Jovičich (piano, Serbia), Maja Jokanovich (violin, Serbia), Ilija Marinkovich (violin, Vienna), Nemanja Radulovich (violin, Paris), Nenad Lečich (Köln), Ognjen Popovich (clarinet, Serbia), Lidija Bizjak (piano Paris), Sanja Bizjak (piano, Paris).

On 14 November 2016 Medakovich celebrated 40 years of artistic work at Ilija M. Kolarac Endowment.

Sources

External links 
Уметнички ансамбл „Станислав Бинички“, official website
Pavle Medakovic, official website

1953 births
Living people
Serbian conductors (music)
21st-century conductors (music)